Amy Beth Bloom (born 1953) is an American writer and psychotherapist. She is professor of creative writing at Wesleyan University, and has been nominated for the National Book Award and the National Book Critics Circle Award.

Biography
Bloom is the daughter of Murray Teigh Bloom (1916–2009), an author, and Sydelle J. Cohen, a psychotherapist. Bloom received a Bachelor of Arts degree in Theater/Political Science, magna cum laude, Phi Beta Kappa, from Wesleyan University, and a M.S.W. (Master of Social Work) from Smith College.

Trained as a social worker, Bloom has practiced psychotherapy. Currently, Bloom is the Kim-Frank Family University Writer in Residence at Wesleyan University (effective July 1, 2010). Previously, she was a senior lecturer of creative writing in the department of English at Yale University, where she taught Advanced Fiction Writing, Writing for Television, and Writing for Children.

Bloom has written articles in periodicals including The New Yorker, The New York Times Magazine, the Atlantic Monthly, Vogue, Slate, and Salon.com. Her short fiction has appeared in The Best American Short Stories, The O. Henry Prize Stories and several other anthologies, and has won a National Magazine Award. In 1993, Bloom was nominated for the National Book Award for Fiction for Come to Me: Stories and in 2000 was a finalist for the National Book Critics Circle Award for A Blind Man Can See How Much I Love You.

Having undergone training as a clinical social worker at the Smith College School for Social Work, Bloom used her understanding of psychotherapy in creating the 2007 Lifetime Television network TV show, State of Mind, which looked at the professional lives of psychotherapists. Bloom is listed as creator, co-executive producer, and head writer for the series.

In August 2012, Bloom published her first children's book, entitled Little Sweet Potato (HarperCollins). According to the New York Times, the story "follows the trials of a 'lumpy, dumpy, bumpy' young tuber who is accidentally expelled from his garden patch and must find a new home. On his journey, he is castigated first by a bunch of xenophobic carrots, then by a menacing gang of vain eggplants."

Personal life 
Bloom currently resides in Connecticut. Though sometimes referred to as a cousin of literary critic Harold Bloom, she says their "cousinhood is entirely artificial and volitional".

She has been married to two men, with a relationship with a woman in between. She has three children with her first husband, James Donald Moon. Her sister, Ellen Bloom, is married to physicist Michael Lubell.

Her father was the freelance writer Murray Teigh Bloom, a founder and former president of the American Society of Journalists and Authors.

Works

Fiction

Novels
 Love Invents Us (1997)
 Away (2007)
 Lucky Us (2014)
 White Houses (2018)

Short stories
 Come to Me: Stories (1993)
 A Blind Man Can See How Much I Love You: Stories (2000)
 The Story (2006)
 Where the God of Love Hangs Out (2009)
 Rowing to Eden (2015)

Non-fiction
 Normal: Transsexual CEOs, Cross-dressing Cops, and Hermaphrodites with Attitude (2002)
 In Love: A Memoir of Love and Loss (2022)

Screenplays, teleplays and television shows
 State of Mind (2007)
 Wish Dragon (2021)

References

External links

Amy Bloom's Official Site
An Interview with Amy Bloom at Rollins College (March 2015)
Identity Theory Interview: Amy Bloom
New York State Writer's Institute: Amy Bloom
Amy Bloom Faculty Biography at Yale University
Speaking of Stories: Amy Bloom
Interview with Richard Wolinsky on KPFA-FM (August 21, 2008)
Interview with Richard Wolinsky on KPFA-FM (September 4, 2014)
"A Portion of Your Loveliness" a short story, Narrative Magazine (Winter 2007).

American women psychologists
21st-century American psychologists
20th-century American novelists
American women novelists
Bisexual women
American women short story writers
21st-century American novelists
American LGBT novelists
20th-century American women writers
21st-century American women writers
20th-century American short story writers
21st-century American short story writers
Wesleyan University alumni
Smith College alumni
Place of birth missing (living people)
1953 births
Living people
21st-century American LGBT people
20th-century American psychologists
American bisexual writers
LGBT psychologists